Susan Moore may refer to:

Fictional characters
 Susan Moore, fictional character in Ted Bundy (film)
 Susan Moore, fictional character in Every Night at Eight
 Susan Moore (General Hospital), a character on the American TV series General Hospital

Other uses
 Susan Moore, African American doctor who died from Covid-19, see Death of Susan Moore
 Susan Moore, Alabama, a city in the United States
 Susan Waters (1823–1900), née Moore, American artist

See also
 Sue Moore (disambiguation)
 Suzanne Moore (born 1958), English journalist